Psephenus is a genus of water penny beetles in the family Psephenidae. There are about 13 described species in Psephenus.

Species
These 13 species belong to the genus Psephenus:

 Psephenus arizonensis Brown & Murvosh, 1974
 Psephenus falli Casey, 1893
 Psephenus haldemani Horn, 1870
 Psephenus herricki (Dekay, 1844)
 Psephenus lutulentus Scudder, 1900
 Psephenus minckleyi Brown & Murvosh, 1974
 Psephenus montanus Brown & Murvosh, 1974
 Psephenus murvoshi Brown, 1970
 Psephenus oresbius Spangler, 1968
 Psephenus palpalis Champion, 1913
 Psephenus spangleri
 Psephenus texanus Brown & Arrington, 1967 (Texas water penny)
 Psephenus usingeri Hinton, 1934

References

Further reading

 
 

Byrrhoidea
Articles created by Qbugbot